Edward G. Payne (July 10, 1951 – July 7, 2021) was an American college basketball coach and the head men's basketball coach at the University of South Carolina Upstate.  Payne led the USC Upstate Spartans through their first season of Division I competition in 2007–2008. In 2012, he was named the Atlantic Sun Conference Coach of the Year. Prior to arriving at USC Upstate, Payne was a Div I head coach at Oregon State University and East Carolina University. Payne's son, Luke, was one of his assistant coaches at USC Upstate from 2012 to 2015. Payne announced his retirement from USC Upstate on October 3, 2017, citing complications from ankle surgeries in the off-season. He died in 2021, due to complications of a stroke at the age of 69

Head coaching record

References

External links
 USC Upstate profile

1951 births
2021 deaths
American men's basketball coaches
American men's basketball players
Basketball coaches from North Carolina
Basketball players from Charlotte, North Carolina
Belmont Abbey Crusaders men's basketball coaches
Clemson Tigers men's basketball coaches
College men's basketball head coaches in the United States
East Carolina Pirates men's basketball coaches
Greensboro Pride men's basketball coaches
Oregon State Beavers men's basketball coaches
South Carolina Gamecocks men's basketball coaches
Sportspeople from Charlotte, North Carolina
Truett McConnell Bears men's basketball coaches
USC Upstate Spartans men's basketball coaches
Wake Forest Demon Deacons men's basketball players